Dmitri Alekseyevich Lagunov (3 September (O.S. 15 September) 1888-10 February 1942) was a Russian Empire and Soviet football player. He died as a civilian in the Siege of Leningrad during World War II.

International career
Lagunov played his only game for Russia on September 14, 1913 in a friendly against Norway.

References

External links
  Profile

1888 births
1942 deaths
Footballers from the Russian Empire
Soviet footballers
Association football defenders
Victims of the Siege of Leningrad